CJ3 may refer to:

Jeep CJ-3 land vehicle
Cessna CitationJet CJ3 aircraft